Nate Holland (born November 8, 1978 in Sandpoint, Idaho) is an American snowboarder.

Holland won a gold medal in Snowboard Cross at the 2007 Winter X Games XI in Aspen, Colorado. He won another gold medal at the 2008 Winter X Games XII, beating Markus Schairer in the finals. He competed for USA at the 2006 Winter Olympics in Turin, where he finished fourteenth; at the 2010 Winter Olympics in Vancouver, where he finished fourth; and at the 2014 Winter Olympics in Sochi, where he was eliminated in the quarterfinals. Nate has won seven gold medals in the X-games, five of which were back to back, creating a new world record for most medals won in a row in Boarder-X. Nate Holland has been paving the way for his sport, competing in races long before it was an official Olympic competition. Nate has competed in the Olympics three times.

Personal life
Nate Holland married his wife, Christen, in June, 2012. They live in the North Tahoe area, in Truckee, Calif. Nate is the middle child of three brothers. His younger brother, Pat Holland, also competes in Boarder-X competitions.

References

External links
 
 
 
 
 

1978 births
Living people
X Games athletes
American male snowboarders
Snowboarders at the 2006 Winter Olympics
Snowboarders at the 2010 Winter Olympics
Snowboarders at the 2014 Winter Olympics
Olympic snowboarders of the United States
20th-century American people
21st-century American people
People from Olympic Valley, California